The 2004 Democrats Abroad presidential caucuses were held between February 6, 2004 and February 9 as one of the Democratic Party's nomination contests ahead of the 2004 presidential election.

Results

References 

Democrats Abroad
2004